Events from the year 1902 in Italy.

Kingdom of Italy
Monarch – Victor Emmanuel III (1900–1946)
Prime Minister – Giuseppe Zanardelli (1901–1903)
Population – 32,787,000

Events
In 1902 a new working law limited the working day for women to 11 hours and prohibited employment of children under the age of 12. Socialist trade unionism enjoys rapid growth in 1901–02. In 1902 nearly 250,000 industrial workers were organized in the Socialist national federations. The main labour organizations, the Camera del Lavoro (Labour Exchange) also expanded rapidly: from 14 in 1900 to 76 in 1902.

May

 May 10 – The Prima Esposizione Internazionale d'Arte Decorativa Moderna (First International Exposition of Modern Decorative Arts) opens in Turin, spreading the popularity of Art Nouveau design.
 May 20 – Italy annexes the town of Raheita on the Strait of Bab-el-Mandeb to Italian Eritrea after disturbances caused by the Sultan of Raheita.

June
 June 7 – Italy takes in possession its concession in Tientsin from the Chinese government.
 June 28 – The Triple Alliance among Germany, Austria–Hungary, and Italy is renewed by Foreign Minister Giulio Prinetti.
 June 30 – Italy and France sign a secret treaty whereby France agreed to back Italy's claims in Libya (Tripolitania), while Italy supported French influence in Morocco. Italy was to remain neutral in case of German aggression against France, undermining the Triple Alliance.

July

 July 14 – St Mark's Campanile, the bell tower of St Mark's Basilica in Venice, one of the most recognizable symbols of the city, collapses.

August
 August 1 – The conviction of the former Deputy from Palermo, Raffaele Palizzolo, for the murder in 1893 of Emanuele Notarbartolo, former mayor of Palermo and former director general of the Banco di Sicilia, is hailed as a big blow against the Sicilian Mafia. The Assize Court in Bologna convicted Palizzolo and two others to 30 years of imprisonment.
 August 28 – King Victor Emmanuel III of Italy and Italian Minister of Foreign Affairs Giulio Prinetti make a state visit to Germany in Berlin.
 August 29 – General strike in Florence in support of a labour conflict at the Pignone iron works. Six thousands troops are called out to maintain order. With the exception of the metal workers of the Pignone iron works, most strikers returned to work on September 2.

September

 September 8 – Five persons are killed and 10 wounded in Candela (Apulia) during a strike of 400 peasants over a dispute with landowners over wages. The strikers blocked all the roads in the area and the military was called out resulting in violent clashes that ended in troops firing at the strikers.
 September 14–30 – Prime Minister Zanardelli undertakes a journey through Basilicata – one of the poorest regions in Italy – to see for himself the problems in the Mezzogiorno.
 September 26 – A violent cyclone hits the east coast of Sicily. The town of Catania is flooded; 300 lives are lost in Modica. The Cathedral of Belpasso was partly destroyed burying worshippers in the ruins. 600 people were reported dead.

November
 November 10 – Bocconi University is founded by Ferdinando Bocconi in Milan.
 November 15 – Prime Minister Zanardelli presents social reforms, including a reduction of the tax on salt, partial abolition of the land tax for small holdings and exemption of income tax for workmen's wages, as well as a Divorce Bill.
 November 26 – In response the social reforms presented by the government, conservative opposition leader Sidney Sonnino introduces a reform bill to alleviate poverty in southern Italy. The bill provides for a reduction of the land tax in Sicily, Calabria and Sardinia, the facilitation of agricultural credit, the re-establishment of the system of perpetual lease for small holdings (emphyteusis) dissemination and enhancement of agrarian contracts in order to combine the interests of farmers with those of the land-owners.

December
 December 9 – Start of the Venezuelan crisis, in which Britain, Germany and Italy sustain a naval blockade on Venezuela in order to enforce collection of outstanding financial claims and President Cipriano Castro's refusal to pay foreign debts and damages suffered by European citizens in the 1892 Venezuelan civil war.

Births
 May 30 – Giuseppina Projetto, Italian supercentenarian, longest surviving person born in 1902 (d. 2018) 
 April 18 – Giuseppe Pella,  Italian politician and Prime Minister (d. 1981)
 September 20 – Cesare Zavattini, Italian screenwriter and one of the first theorists and proponents of Italian neorealism (d. 1989)
 November 29 – Carlo Levi, Italian-Jewish anti-fascist and writer of Cristo si è fermato a Eboli (Christ Stopped at Eboli) (d. 1975)
 November 30 – Maria Bellonci, Italian writer, historian and journalist (d. 1986)

Deaths
 March 28 – Angelo Dubini, Italian physician (b. 1813)
 May 7 – Guido Boggiani, "pioneer of fieldwork" in Italian ethnology (b. 1861)

References

 Childs, Timothy Winston (1990). Italo-Turkish Diplomacy and the War Over Libya: 1911–1912, Leiden: E.J. Brill, 
 Clark, Martin (2014). Modern Italy: 1871 to the present, Third Edition, London/New York: Routledge, 

 
Italy
Years of the 20th century in Italy